Sagephora felix is a species of moth in the family Tineidae. It was described by Edward Meyrick in 1914. This species is endemic to New Zealand and can be found in the north half of the North Island. It inhabits native forest and adults of the species are on the wing from December to May, in July and November.

Taxonomy
This species was first described by Edward Meyrick in 1914, using a specimen collected by George Hudson at Kaeo in January, and named Sagephora felix. In 1928 George Hudson discussed and illustrated this species using that name. The male holotype specimen is held in the Natural History Museum, London.

Description

This species was described by Meyrick as follows:

Distribution
This species is endemic to New Zealand. This species has been collected at its type locality Kaeo, as well as at Auckland and Wellington.

Habitat 
This species inhabits native forest.

Behaviour 
The adults of this species are on the wing December to May, July and November.

References

External links
Image of type specimen of Sagephora felix.

Moths described in 1914
Tineidae
Moths of New Zealand
Endemic fauna of New Zealand
Taxa named by Edward Meyrick
Endemic moths of New Zealand